The West Riding Professorship of Music was established as a named chair at the University of Leeds in 1949 and paid for, initially, by £5,000 annually from the West Riding County Council. The first appointee was J. R. Denny, who took up the chair in 1950.

List of West Riding Professors of Music 
 1950–1971: James Runciman Denny, MBE.
 1971–1976: Alexander Goehr.
 1977–1981: Ian Manson Kemp.
 1982–2002: Julian Gordon Rushton.

References 

University of Leeds